Natalia Stratulat (born 24 July 1987) is a Moldovan athlete specialising in the discus throw. She represented her country at the 2016 Summer Olympics without qualifying for the final.

Her personal best in the event is 62.13 metres set is Vila Réal de Santo António in 2012.

International competitions

References

1987 births
Living people
Moldovan female discus throwers
Athletes (track and field) at the 2015 European Games
Athletes (track and field) at the 2016 Summer Olympics
Olympic athletes of Moldova
European Games competitors for Moldova
Competitors at the 2015 Summer Universiade